Corbett is an English-language surname. It is derived from the Anglo-Norman French, Middle English, and Old French corbet, which is a diminutive of corb, meaning "raven". The surname probably originated from a nickname referring to someone with dark hair or a dark complexion like a raven's. The surname was brought to England from Normandy, and spread to Scotland in the 12th century, and into northern Ireland in the 17th century. Early instances of the name are Corbet in Shropshire, recorded in Domesday Book in 1086; Corbet in Shropshire, recorded in the Assize Rolls of Worcestershire in 1158; and le Corbet in Oxfordshire, recorded in the Eynsham Cartulary in 1323. Variations of the surname include: Corbet, and Corbitt. Corbett is sometimes an Anglicised form of the Irish surnames Ó Corbáin and Ó Coirbín, which mean "descendant of Corbán" and "descendant of Coirbín", respectively.

Names borne by several Corbetts
Jim Corbett (including James Corbett)
John Corbett (disambiguation)
Michael Corbett
William Corbett
Uvedale Corbett (disambiguation)

In politics
 Albert H. C. Corbett, politician in Manitoba, Canada
 Alfred H. Corbett, politician in Oregon, United States
 Archibald Corbett, 1st Baron Rowallan, Scottish Liberal politician
 Arthur Corbett, 3rd Baron Rowallan, British aristocrat most notable for successfully having his second marriage annulled in 1970
 Henry W. Corbett, 3rd United States senator from Oregon
 Irvine Finlay Corbett, politician in British Columbia, Canada
 Jerry Corbett (1917–1997), Illinois state representative
 John Corbett (industrialist) (1817–1901), English industrialist, politician and philanthropist
 James Corbett (Australian politician) (1906–2005), Australian Country Party politician
 James A. Corbett (1933–2001), American rancher, writer, and human rights activist
 Jim Corbett (politician), U.S. politician
 Moses Corbet, major (1728–1814), lieutenant governor of Jersey from 4 Apr 1771 to 1781
 Panton Corbett, MP (1785–1855)
 Richard Corbett, member of the European Parliament for the Labour Party for Yorkshire and the Humber
 Robert Corbett, politician in New Brunswick, Canada
 Robin Corbett, Baron Corbett of Castle Vale, the Labour member of parliament for Birmingham, Erdington
 Ron Corbett, mayor of Cedar Rapids, Iowa
 Thomas Corbett, 2nd Baron Rowallan, Bronze Wolf awardee
 Tom Corbett, governor of Pennsylvania (2011–2015)

In sport
 Arch Corbett (1883–1920), Australian rules footballer
 Austin Corbett, American football player
 Claude Corbett, Australian sports journalist
 Doug Corbett (born 1952), American baseball pitcher
 Fred Corbett, English footballer who played in the late 19th and early 20th century
 Gene Corbett, major league first baseman from 1936 to 1938
 Harold Corbett, Australian rugby league footballer
 James J. Corbett, heavyweight boxing champion
 Joe Corbett, major league starting pitcher who played in the National League
 John Corbett (coach), American football player and college sports coach
 Leo Corbett, Australian footballer
 Marius Corbett, South African javelin thrower
 Mike Corbett (ice hockey, born 1942), professional hockey player
 Mike Corbett (ice hockey, born 1972)
 Norman Corbett, Scottish footballer
 Willie Corbett, Scottish footballer
 Young Corbett III, the world welterweight boxing champion
 Steve Corbett, American football Offensive Guard

In literature
 Edward P. J. Corbett, author
 The Misses Corbett, Grace (–1843) and Walterina (died 1837), Scottish poets and authors
 Maryann Corbett, American poet, medievalist, and linguist
 Sarah Corbett, British poet born 1970, received Eric Gregory Award 1997
 Scott Corbett children's author
 Steve Corbett, author of When Helping Hurts

In business
 Gerald Corbett (born 1951), head of Railtrack
 Henry L. Corbett (1881–1957), American businessman and politician, in Oregon
 Kevin Corbett (born 1955), American businessman, shipping and transportation, ED of NJTranist
 Roger Corbett (born 1942), Australian businessman, CEO of Woolworths Ltd 2001–2007

In television, film and fiction
 Ben Corbett (1892–1961), American actor
 Bill Corbett, playwright, television writer, screenwriter, and performer
 Daniel Corbett, British meteorologist
 Glenn Corbett, American actor
 Gretchen Corbett, American actress most noted for the role of "Beth Davenport" on the television series The Rockford Files
 Harry Corbett (1918–1989), British puppeteer
 Harry H. Corbett (1925–1982), British actor
 Jeremy Corbett, New Zealand comedian
 John Corbett (born 1961), American actor
 Kari Corbett, Scottish actress
 Matthew Corbett (born 1948), British television personality known for The Sooty Show
 Ronnie Corbett (1930–2016), Scottish comedian and actor
 Shaun Taylor-Corbett, American actor
 Susannah Corbett, English actress
 Tom Corbett, Space Cadet, the main character in a series of Tom Corbett — Space Cadet stories
 Winslow Corbett, American actress and the daughter of Rockford Files supporting player Gretchen Corbett

In the military
 Boston Corbett, the Union soldier who shot and mortally wounded Abraham Lincoln's assassin, John Wilkes Booth
Elsie Cameron Corbett (1893 –1977), volunteer ambulance driver in World War I
 Frederick Corbett, English recipient of the Victoria Cross
 Julian Corbett, British naval historian and geostrategist of the late 19th and early 20th centuries
 Thomas Corbett, Indian Army officer

In geography
 John Rooke Corbett, mountaineer and compiler of list of peaks between 2500 and 3000 feet.

In other fields
Edwin Corbett (1819–1888), British diplomat, envoy to several countries
Greville G Corbett (born 1947), British linguist
Jim Corbett (1875–1955), British hunter and naturalist in India
James W. Corbett (1928–1994), American physicist
Jonathan Corbett, British TV presenter, food commentator & buyer for Tesco
Joseph Corbett Jr. (1928–2009), American former Fulbright scholar jailed for murder
Liz Corbett English epidemiologist
Margaret Darst Corbett (1889–1962), American vision educator
Ned Corbett (1887–1964), Canadian adult educator and leader in the field.
Sidney Corbett (born 1960), American composer based in Germany
Ted Corbett (chemist) (1923–2018), New Zealand organic chemist

See also
 Corbet
 Corbet baronets
 Corbett (disambiguation)
 Corbeau (disambiguation)

References

English-language surnames